Vyron Athanasiadis (born 1900, date of death unknown) was a Greek long-distance runner. He competed in the 10,000 metres and the marathon at the 1924 Summer Olympics.

References

External links
 

1900 births
Year of death missing
Athletes (track and field) at the 1924 Summer Olympics
Greek male long-distance runners
Greek male marathon runners
Olympic athletes of Greece
20th-century Greek people